Richmond Hill High School is a secondary school located in the City of Richmond Hill, Ontario, Canada. It is the second oldest high school in York Region Municipality (and behind Newmarket High School c. 1843), being established in the mid-19th century. The school is a host to several regional special education programs, including an Advanced Placement Program, Alternative Education Program, Cooperative Education Program, Developmentally-Delayed Program, and an Orthopedic Program. The school has a small gifted program along with all other secondary schools in York Region.

In the 2016-2017 Fraser Institute rankings, Richmond Hill ranked 19th in the province of Ontario and 7th in York Region, with an overall score of 8.7/10.

History
Richmond Hill High School is one of the oldest secondary schools in the Greater Toronto Area, founded on December 2, 1851. It has expanded and changed locations on several occasions including in 1853, 1872, 1897, 1924, 1950, and 2000, having had been located on Yonge St. and Wright St. in 'downtown' Richmond Hill before moving to its present location at 201 Yorkland Street in September 2000.

In 1948–9, the Richmond Hill High School Literary Society erected a metal plaque as a list of honour memorial dedicated to the former students of the school who died in service during the First and Second World Wars. The plaque is now mounted on the east wall between the outer and inner doors of the main entrance of the school.

In 2005, former president of South Africa and 1993 Nobel Peace Prize Winner F.W De Klerk visited the school, spoke to students and staff about his part in the end of the apartheid system, and answered students' questions during an hour-long session.

Building & Site

It houses two gymnasiums, a fitness and weight training room, a cafetorium including a stage, a library, a communications technology room including a green and blue screen, vocal and instrumental/band music rooms, two visual art studio classroom/workspaces and six 'pods' with a central computer lab surrounded by four conventional classrooms, a science lab classroom and two teaching staff workrooms/offices.

The original Yorkland Street building was built to accommodate a student population of 1400 students, but due to continued residential building in the school's catchment area and the strength of the school's academic reputation, the school has consistently enrolled 1600+ students since shortly after its opening.  This has necessitated the use of portables as classrooms, with the number of portables growing to nine as of September 2016.

The two older buildings still survive, with the old 1851 building now a coffee shop on Yonge Street, and the 1950 building continuing to operate as the French secondary school "École secondaire Norval-Morrisseau."

'Books' by E.B. Cox

Situated in front of the main entrance of the present Yorkland Street building, in the grass median between the incoming and outbound driveways, is a sculpture entitled "Books" created by renowned and deceased Canadian sculptor E.B. Cox.

In 1967, the staff and students of the school raised $4,000 (equivalent to over $28,000 in 2017) to commission the piece as a commemoration of the 100th anniversary of Canadian Confederation.  It was originally installed at the Wright Street location upon its completion in 1968, and was moved to Yorkland Street when the school switched locations.

The sculpture is meant to represent a column of books towering up to the sky, representing the importance of books as a tool of learning.

Notable alumni
Josh Binstock, Olympic volleyball player
Evan Fong, YouTube gaming celebrity and  EDM producer also known as VanossGaming
Michelle Li, Canadian Olympic badminton player
Farley Mowat, World War II veteran, conservationist and author
Mag Ruffman, comedian, actress and television host
Wendy Shon (Seung-Wan ‘Wendy’ Shon), singer and member of South Korean K-pop girl group Red Velvet
R. H. Thomson, actor and filmmaker
Kathleen Wynne, Premier of Ontario
Norman J. Wildberger, Mathematics Professor at UNSW and well-known online mathematics communicator
Brian Yang, Canadian Olympic badminton player

See also
List of high schools in Ontario
York Region District School Board
Richmond Hill, Ontario
Advanced Placement
History Of Richmond Hill, Ontario

References

External links
Richmond Hill High School Website

York Region District School Board
High schools in the Regional Municipality of York
Education in Richmond Hill, Ontario
Educational institutions established in 1851
1851 establishments in Ontario